The following is a list of current and former programming blocks airing animated television programs.

Current

United States

Canada
Animation Rules
Teletoon at Night
The Zone
The Zone Weekend

Australia
Animation Domination
Animation Fixation
Animation Salvation
Adult Swim

United Kingdom
Adult Swim

Japan
Animeism
Noitamina
+Ultra

Ireland
Adult Swim

Spain
Boing

Former

United States

References

 
Animated